The 2019–20 NISA season was the inaugural season of the National Independent Soccer Association's third-division soccer competition. The regular season was split into two halves, fall and spring, with playoffs at the end. The fall season, named "NISA Showcase", featured seven teams, with the East and West champions earning berths into the 2020 playoffs. The spring season featured eight teams, and switches to a single table format, the top 3 teams joining California United Strikers in the playoffs.

The spring season was suspended on March 12, for 30 days, due to the coronavirus pandemic. The suspension was then extended in accordance with CDC guidelines and eventually made permanent on April 27, 2020.

Teams

Stadiums and locations

Personnel and sponsorship
''Note: The league has signed a deal with Hummel to be the official kit manufacturer, but it still allows clubs to find their own provider.

Fall season
Miami FC and California United Strikers FC played seven matches while the rest of the league played only six. To accommodate for this, the Miami FC home match against Oakland Roots SC did not count in the standings for Miami and the second California United Strikers FC home match against San Diego 1904 FC did not count in the standings for Cal United.

Standings

East Coast standings

West Coast standings

Results

Playoffs
The top two eastern teams will meet in the East Coast Championship while the top two western teams will meet in the West Coast Championship. Each champion will earn an automatic berth into the Spring 2020 playoffs.

Spring season

The 2020 Spring season began on February 28 and featured eight teams (five teams that also played in the Fall season, plus three new entries). It consisted of a single table instead of the conferences used during Fall. The top three teams would have qualified for the Playoffs, together with California United Strikers, already qualified because of their Fall season West Championship win.

The spring season was suspended on March 12, for 30 days, due to the coronavirus pandemic. The suspension was then extended in accordance with CDC guidelines and eventually made permanent on April 27, 2020.

Standings

Results

Notes

See also
 National Independent Soccer Association

References

External links
 NISA official website

2019-20
2019 in American soccer leagues
2020 in American soccer leagues
United States